Dawid Petrus 'Dewald' Pretorius (born 29 November 1986) is a South African rugby union footballer. He plays mostly as a centre or wing.

He was a member of the Pumas side that won the Vodacom Cup for the first time in 2015, beating  24–7 in the final. Pretorius made a single appearance during the season.

References

External links

itsrugby.co.uk profile

1986 births
Living people
Blue Bulls players
Falcons (rugby union) players
Griquas (rugby union) players
Pumas (Currie Cup) players
Rugby union centres
Rugby union players from Welkom
South African rugby union players